Laluque is a commune in the Landes department in Nouvelle-Aquitaine in south-western France.

See also
Communes of the Landes department

Toponymy 
Laluque would come from the Latin word Lucus which means sacred wood in Latin

Sport 
There is a sports club called the USL (L'Union Sportive Laluquoise) evolving promotion level second division (formerly promotion first division) in the district of Landes. The Laluque Music School.

History 
Henri Ferrand blew up 50 wagons on his one, he fought for the liberation of the France.  The Laluque's museum is a Traditional house from the early 19th century with half-timbered walls and briquettes - the museum allows you to go back in time. The guides welcome you and accompany you to the rooms that have preserved the decor of life of our ancestors. Collections of objects - tools of old trades - activities of the farm and the forest are exposed in the attic. Themes are presented in the dependencies like the school formerly - agricultural machinery ...

Education 
Laluque includes a nursery school of 73 students located at 50 avenue Fontaine, in area A

Economy 
Formerly marked by forestry activity and the exploitation of lignite deposits, Laluque owes its development to the Paris-Hendaye railway line.

References

Communes of Landes (department)